Mahagaon may refer to:
 Mahagaon, Gadhinglaj, Kolhapur district, Maharashtra, India
 Mahagaon, Mawal, Pune district, Maharashtra, India
 Mahagaon, Yavatmal, Maharashtra, India